Calisto tasajera is a butterfly of the family Nymphalidae. It is endemic to Hispaniola, where it is found in the highlands of the Cordillera Central.

The larvae feed on Danthonia domingenisis.

References

Butterflies described in 1991
Calisto (butterfly)